This is the discography of Singaporean Pop musician, singer-songwriter and music producer, Gentle Bones also known as Joel Tan.

Gentle Bones has released 1 studio album, 4 extended plays, and 20 singles since his debut in 2012.

Albums

Studio albums

Extended plays

Extended plays

Singles

References

Discographies of Singaporean artists